Melissa Rooker (June 29, 1964) is a Republican and former member of the Kansas House of Representatives and formerly the director of development of Malpaso Productions.

Biography
Rooker was raised in Fairway, Kansas. She graduated from Shawnee Mission East High School in Prairie Village, Kansas, and the University of Kansas, and is married with two children.

Film career
Rooker became director of development of Malpaso Productions in 1995. Previously, she had been an assistant to the company's founder, Clint Eastwood.

Political career
Rooker was a member of the Kansas House of Representatives until 2019. She is a Republican.

References

People from Prairie Village, Kansas
Republican Party members of the Kansas House of Representatives
Women state legislators in Kansas
American filmmakers
University of Kansas alumni
Living people
21st-century American politicians
21st-century American women politicians
People from Johnson County, Kansas
1964 births